Antimetric may refer to:

 Antimetric (electrical networks) of a network that exhibits anti-symmetrical electrical properties
 Antimetric matrix, a matrix equal to its negative transpose
 Antimetrication, a position opposed to the use of the metric system of measurements